Capsosiphon is a genus of green algae in the family Ulotrichaceae.

Effect 
Calcium and iron are particularly abundant in the general components of the mesophyll, with 20.6% of the protein, 0.5% of the fat, 35.4% of the carbohydrate, 1.5% of the fiber and 22.7% of the mineral. The components of the dried product are crude protein 4.6% ~ 6.6%, crude fat 1.1 ~ 1.4%, crude fiber 2.5 ~ 4.2%, ash 28.6 ~ 49.2% and soluble nitrogen free 40.9 ~ 60.9%. It is mainly edible in the southern coastal region and has a sweet taste than parasitic, so it is delicious. It has a good effect of preventing and calming the gastric ulcer or duodenal ulcer. Especially low blood pressure low cholesterol and hypertension and atherosclerosis therapy is said to be effective as a treatment. Contains a large amount of calcium and iron, and is good for children to promote growth and prevention of osteoporosis.

References

External links

Ulvophyceae genera
Ulotrichaceae